The name Teresa has been used for one tropical cyclone and one subtropical cyclone worldwide. 

In the Atlantic: 
 Subtropical Storm Teresa (2021), a weak and disorganized storm that stayed at sea. 

In the Western Pacific: 
 Typhoon Teresa (1994) (T9430, 33W, Katring), caused significant damage in the Philippines.

Atlantic hurricane set index articles
Pacific typhoon set index articles